Obz could refer to:
The suburb of Observatory, Cape Town
Occupy Buffer Zone, a protest movement on Cyprus